Clifton K. Hillegass (18 April 1918 in Rising City, Nebraska – 5 May 2001 in Lincoln, Nebraska) was the creator and publisher of CliffsNotes.

CliffsNotes are study guides that assist college and high school students in their literature course work. CliffsNotes began in 1958 as $1 reprints of Canadian study guides for 16 plays by Shakespeare.  At that time, Hillegass worked for a major distributor of college textbooks.  He knew hundreds of campus bookstore managers across the country.  Those close relationships gave him the first outlets for the Notes.  Sales expanded rapidly as high school students began to buy the slim yellow and black pamphlets.  By the early 1970s the company had created additional study aids—exam reviews, course outlines, law school materials, and test preparation kits for the SAT, ACT, GRE, and GMAT.

As the company grew, Hillegass kept its headquarters in Lincoln, Nebraska.  Each year he donated 10% of the pre-tax profits to local charities and civic organizations (which, on his death, received half of his estate).  Most employees were lifetime Lincoln residents.  After he sold the company in 1999, Hillegass endowed a chair in English at the University of Nebraska.

Clifton Hillegass graduated from Midland Lutheran College and then studied physics and geology for two years at the University of Nebraska.  He later received four honorary degrees.

References

A Brief History of CliffsNotes (Wayback Machine)

Further reading
 
Robert L. Hampel, Fast and Curious: A History of Shortcuts in American Education (Rowman and Littlefield: Lanham MD, 2017), Ch. 2.

1918 births
2001 deaths
People from Butler County, Nebraska
American publishers (people)
Midland University alumni

20th-century American businesspeople